Finnish bandy champion is the title given to the team winning the play-off at the end of Bandyliiga, the highest bandy league in Finland.

Bandy was the first team sport, for which a Finnish championship was contested. This was in early 1908 (while the first Finnish championship in association football were played later the same year). The league and the championship are administrated by Finland's Bandy Association.

Finnish Workers' Sports Federation had its own Finnish bandy championship tournament 1924–1955.

Winners through the years

Men

Notes

Women

The first women's championships were only played in 1979. No women's championships were played 1993–2005.

Titles

Men's titles per club
Helsingfors IFK (HIFK) has won the most titles as of 2019.

 17: IFK Helsingfors
 16: Warkauden Pallo -35
 16: Oulun Luistinseura
 14: Sudet
 7: Oulun Palloseura
 6: Tornion Palloveikot
 6: Veiterä
 5: Helsingin Jalkapalloklubi
 5: Lappeenrannan Veiterä
 4: Veitsiluodon Vastus
 4: Botnia-69, Helsinki
 2: Porin Narukerä
 2: Akilles, Porvoo
 2: Polyteknikkojen Urheiluseura, Helsinki
 2: Käpylän Urheilu-Veikot, Helsinki
 2: Viipurin Palloseura
 2: Mikkelin Kampparit
 1: Mikkelin Palloilijat
 1: Lappeenrannan Urheilu-Miehet
 1: Jyväskylän Seudun Palloseura

Men's and women's titles the same year

Final matches for the Finnish Workers' Sports Federation 1924–1955

Finnish champions vs. Finnish Workers champions 1947–1953 
Final matches between the official Finnish champions and Finnish Workers' Sports Federation's bandy champions 1947–1953.
1947–1953: 1947 Porin Pallo-Toverit, 1948–1952 Turun Pyrkivä and 1953 Oulun Työväen Palloilijat..
.

See also 
 Bandyliiga

Sources 
 Voitto Raatikainen: Talviurheilun sankarit, Tulos- ja tilastoliite s.460
 MMM 1981 s.445
 Urheilumme Kasvot 3 Palloilu
 Martti Jukola: Urheilun Pikku Jättiläinen, 1951

References

Bandy in Finland
Finland
Bandy